is a Japanese professional golfer.

Ohmachi played on the Japan Golf Tour, winning four times. He also played on the PGA Tour in 1987 and 1988, with a best finish of T-6 at the 1987 Houston Open.

Professional wins (5)

Japan Golf Tour wins (4)

*Note: The 1986 Shizuoka Open was shortened to 63 holes due to weather.

Other wins (1)
1989 Kanagawa Open

See also
1986 PGA Tour Qualifying School graduates

References

External links

Japanese male golfers
Japan Golf Tour golfers
PGA Tour golfers
Sportspeople from Gunma Prefecture
1958 births
Living people
20th-century Japanese people